Saira Banu (born 23 August 1944) is a former Indian actress who mainly worked in Hindi language films. She was one of the most popular actresses in her heyday in the Indian film industry in the 1960s and early 1970s.

Career
Saira Banu was the daughter of Naseem Banu, a stage and film actress. She had one brother, Sultan Ahmed (1939-2016), who was five years older than her.

Banu was 16 years old in 1960 when she started work for her debut in Hindi films. She said in a programme that she had basic talent and little dancing experience. Her peers all were classically trained, which was why she was not put in the top league. Banu started taking Kathak and Bharata Natyam lessons with success, and trained herself professionally. Soon she became a dancer, and her films featured more of her dancing.

Banu made her acting debut opposite Shammi Kapoor in the 1961 film Junglee, for which she earned her first nomination for the Filmfare Award for Best Actress. The famous song from this movie "Yaahoo!! Chahe Koi Mujhe Junglee Kahe" sung by Mohammed Rafi was a big success. Junglee was written by Aghajani Kashmeri (aka Kashmiri and Agha Jani), who also coached her in Urdu dialogue delivery, given his background in Urdu literature and poetry from Lucknow. Junglee was the beginning of her career as a successful actress. Her image was that of a romantic heroine and she acted in many love stories. She did one more film opposite her first hero Shammi Kapoor, Bluff Master, directed by Manmohan Desai. Some of her successful films during this time include Jhuk Gaya Aasman and Aayi Milan Ki Bela, with Rajendra Kumar, and April Fool, with Biswajeet, Aao Pyaar Karen and Shagird with Joy Mukherjee. Banu also did Pyar Mohabbat with Dev Anand.

Aman (1967), opposite Rajendra Kumar, was her first release after her marriage. She acted in three films with Manoj Kumar, Shaadi, Purab Aur Paschim and Balidan. Cult film Padosan, in 1968, opposite Sunil Dutt, catapulted her to the top league and she continued to play the heroine for several years after that. Victoria No. 203 with Navin Nischol is her biggest hit. She acted in three films with her husband: Gopi, Sagina and Bairaag. Only Gopi was successful at the box office. She acted in six with Dharmendra: Jwar Bhata, Aadmi Aur Insaan, Resham Ki Dori, Pocket Maar, International Crook and Chaitali out of which 5 were Superhit. 

In an interview, she quoted that she regretted missing the chance of working with Rajesh Khanna. She quoted: "I was supposed to work with him in Choti Bahu (1971), but I could not because I was ill. I shot with him for two days and found that he was very charming, humble and a shy person." She was paired with Vinod Khanna in hit movie Aarop and Amitabh Bachchan in super hit films Zameer and Hera Pheri. Nehle Pe Dehla with Sunil Dutt in 1976 was her last successful film. With a slew of flops like Daaman Aur Aag, Mounto and Koi Jeeta Koi Haara, and films such as Faisla, Mera Vachan Geeta Ki Kasam and Aarambh on hold, she drew the curtains on her career as a heroine.

She has earned three Filmfare nominations for Best Actress: Shagird (1967), Diwana (1968), and Sagina (1974). However, despite Banu's success, several critics bemoaned that she "made it on glamour and not on talent". In response to the criticism, she stated in a 1973 interview:

Banu appeared in a cameo opposite her husband in Duniya (1984), wherein the song "Teri meri zindagi" became very popular. Her delayed film Faisla was eventually released in 1988 and is officially her last film.

Personal life
Saira Banu married actor Dilip Kumar on 11 October 1966. Banu was 22 and Kumar 44 years old at the time of marriage.

Filmography

References

External links

 

Actresses in Hindi cinema
20th-century Indian Muslims
1944 births
Indian film actresses
Living people
Actresses from Mumbai
20th-century Indian actresses
People from Mussoorie
Actresses from Uttarakhand